Peter or Pete Wilson may refer to:

Pete Wilson
 Pete Wilson (baseball) (1885–1957), American baseball pitcher
 Pete Wilson (born 1933), American politician, former Governor of California
 Pete Wilson (broadcaster) (1945–2007), San Francisco Bay Area TV and radio personality
 Pete Wilson (historian) (born 1957), British historian specialising in Roman archaeology
 Pete Wilson (wrestler) (born 1985), Canadian professional wrestler

Peter Wilson

Music 
 Peter Wilson (singer) (born 1973), Australian singer
 Peter Wilson (musician) (born 1971), Northern Irish musician, also known as Duke Special
 Peter Wilson (record producer), British record producer

Sports 
 Peter Wilson (Australian rules footballer) (born 1963), Australian rules footballer
 Peter Wilson (cricketer, born 1907) (1907–1986), New Zealand cricketer
Peter Wilson (cricketer, born 1944), Zimbabwean-born South African cricketer
 Peter Wilson (curler) (born 1961), Scottish-Irish curler 
 Peter Wilson (field hockey) (born 1942), British Olympic hockey player
 Peter Wilson (footballer, born 1905) (1905–1983), Scottish international footballer
 Peter Wilson (soccer, born 1947), English-born captain of the Australian national soccer team
 Peter Wilson (footballer, born 1996), Liberian footballer
 Peter Wilson (sailor) (born 1960), Zimbabwean sailor
 Peter Wilson (ski jumper) (born 1952), Canadian former ski jumper
 Peter Wilson (American soccer), Scottish-born American soccer player in the 1890s and early 1900s
 Peter Wilson (sport shooter) (born 1986), British sport shooter
 Peter J. D. Wilson (born 1955), Scottish and Irish curler and coach

Other 
 Peter Wilson (bishop) (1883–1956), Bishop of Moray, Ross and Caithness
 Peter Wilson (architect) (born 1950), Australian architect
 Peter Wilson (writer) (born 1951), Australian writer and commentator
 Peter Wilson (murder victim) (1952–1973), Northern Irish kidnap victim; one of the "Disappeared" 
 Peter Wilson (diplomat) (born 1968), British ambassador
 Peter Wilson (auctioneer) (1913–1984), English auctioneer, chairman of Sotheby's
 Peter H. Wilson (born 1963), British historian of German and European history
 Peter John Wilson (1869–1918), Australian architect
 Peter Lamborn Wilson (born 1945), American political writer, essayist, and poet
 Peter Wilson or Wa-o-wa-wa-na-onk (died 1871), Native American physician and Cayuga leader

See also
 Peta Wilson (born 1970), Australian actress known for TV series Nikita